Tommy Lycén (born October 5, 1981 in Rångedala near Borås) is a Swedish football midfielder.

After playing for local clubs and Grimsås IF, he joined IFK Göteborg in 2005. The season 2006 he was on loan to Umeå FC in Superettan. He was sold to IF Brommapojkarna in late 2006 and played with them in Allsvenskan, the highest division in Swedish football, but went on loan to Swedish second division team Örgryte IS a bit into the season. He signed for Allsvenskan team GAIS in 2007. In Gais Lycén had several injury problems, and in 2011 Gais decided to not extend his contract. Instead he signed for Örgryte IS in August 2011.

 Rångedala IK (-1996)
 Brämhults IK (1997–2002)
 Grimsås IF (2003–2004)
 IFK Göteborg (2005–2006)
 Umeå FC (on loan 2006)
 IF Brommapojkarna (2007)
 Örgryte IS (on loan 2007)
 GAIS (2008–2011)
 Örgryte IS (2011-2012)
 Utsiktens BK (2013)
 Västra Frölunda IF (2014-2015)
 Assyriska BK (2018)

References

External links 
 

1981 births
Living people
Swedish footballers
IF Brommapojkarna players
IFK Göteborg players
GAIS players
Örgryte IS players
Umeå FC players
Association football midfielders
People from Borås Municipality
Sportspeople from Västra Götaland County